Acleris laterana is a moth of the family Tortricidae. It is native to the Palearctic realm, but has been accidentally imported into the United States.

The wingspan is about 15–20 mm. In  Europe, adults are on wing from June to July and again from August to September. In greenhouses, a third generation may develop. In Japan and Korea, there are also two generations per year, with adults on wing from May to June and from September to October.

It is a very variable species. The intensity of the greyish suffusion on specimens with a silver-white ground colour may be sufficiently heavy to almost obliterate the ground colour. Often, the ground colour is suffused with grey, giving the wing a cinerous appearance. The ground colour can also be pale yellow-brown varying to ochreous, with the costal blotch and sub-basal fascia dull bluish black. Another form has the ground colour grey-brown, varying considerably in shade, the costal blotch relatively inconspicuous, its inner margin extending across the wing in some specimens.

The larvae feed on Crataegus, Filipendula ulmaria, Populus, Prunus, Rosa, Rubus, Sorbus, Salix, Symphytum officinale and Vaccinium. They feed between spun leaves and may also attack the flowers. The larvae can be found from May to June. Pupation takes place within a silken cocoon spun in a folded leaf.

References

laterana
Moths of Asia
Tortricidae of Europe
Moths described in 1794